Shabana Kausar is a Pakistani former cricketer who played as a bowler. She appeared in three One Day Internationals for Pakistan, all on their tour of Australia and New Zealand in 1997, the side's first ever international series. She made her WODI debut against New Zealand on 28 January 1997.

Kausar took the first ever wicket by a Pakistani woman international, bowling Debbie Hockley in the second ODI of the series.

References

External links
 
 

Date of birth missing (living people)
Year of birth missing (living people)
Living people
Pakistani women cricketers
Pakistan women One Day International cricketers
Place of birth missing (living people)